The Mind's Construction Quarterly was a UK-based magazine and webzine edited by Neil Scott and reporting upon the psychological dimensions of arts and culture. It had a postmodern slant but is classical in terms of its aesthetics.

With its roots in webzine format, a successful pilot issue of a paper version was launched in 2005 featuring a wealth of interviews, features and artworks around the theme of the human form.

The website explains: 

Past writers have included Neil Scott, Rhodri Marsden, Laura Gonzalez, Richard Herring and Robert Wringham. Interviewees have included Stewart Lee, Alex Kapranos, Simon Bookish, Pat Kane and Momus. The magazine folded in 2006.

References

External links
 The Mind's Construction Quarterly
 tMCQ at Zine Wiki
 Noble Savage Publisher of tMCQ

Visual arts magazines published in the United Kingdom
Quarterly magazines published in the United Kingdom
Defunct magazines published in the United Kingdom
Magazines established in 2005
Magazines disestablished in 2006